Stephan Maigaard Andersen (born 26 November 1981) is a Danish professional football player, who plays as a goalkeeper for VB 1968. He was a full international for the Denmark national team and was chosen to represent his country at UEFA Euro 2004, the 2010 FIFA World Cup and UEFA Euro 2012.

Club career

Early years
Starting his career at the youth teams of Hvidovre IF, he moved youth setup of multiple Danish champions Brøndby IF. When he was no longer seen as a long-term prospect for the Brøndby goalkeeping position, he left Brøndby in the winter 1999, to rejoin Hvidovre. Andersen made his senior debut for Hvidovre IF in the lower league Danish 1st Division, and was recognized as a big talent.

AB
In March 2002, Hvidovre owner, and professional goalkeeper, Peter Schmeichel chose to end his engagement in the club. Hvidovre actively sought to off-load Andersen, one of two professional players in the squad. He was initially wanted by a number of clubs in English football, including Schmeichel's club Aston Villa and Sunderland, the club of Danish international goalkeeper Thomas Sørensen. Sunderland opted to buy Norwegian international goalkeeper Thomas Myhre instead, and no other foreign offers materialized. Andersen moved to Akademisk Boldklub (AB) in the top-flight Danish Superliga championship in August 2002.

Charlton Athletic
He moved abroad to join English club Charlton Athletic in a DKK 8 million transfer deal in June 2004. In his first season with the London club, he only made two first team appearances. Due to an injury sustained by first choice goalkeeper Dean Kiely, Andersen started the 2005–06 season in the team. Charlton's poor mid-season form saw him dropped in favour of Kiely at first, then Thomas Myhre, who established himself as first choice as Charlton turned their season around. Andersen was reinstated into the lineup for the last two games of the season, when Myhre suffered an injury. In the 2006 summer transfer window, Andersen looked ready to join Leeds United on a season-long loan deal, but as Charlton insisted on a clause to allow the club to recall Andersen at any time during the season, the transfer fell through at the last moment. In the first half of the 2006–07 season, he saw the loaned-in Scott Carson become Charlton's starting goalkeeper.

Brøndby IF
In November 2006, Andersen signed a transfer deal to move back to Denmark to play for Superliga side Brøndby IF at the start of the January 2007 transfer window. He made some errors in his first time at the club, dropping against Odense Boldklub and Viborg FF, but was kept in the starting line-up and eventually upped his game. He helped Brøndby win the 2008 Danish Cup, and was named 2008 Danish Goalkeeper of the Year.

Later career

In August 2011 he joined former teammate Daniel Wass at Évian in the French Ligue 1 for a fee of DKK 2 million. In the summer of 2013 he signed a two-year contract with Real Betis of the Spanish La Liga. He was sent on loan to Dutch Eredivisie side Go Ahead Eagles on 30 January 2014 for the remainder of the 2013–14 season. On 19 May 2014, it was announced he would return to Denmark on a permanent deal, signing a three-year contract with Superliga side FC Copenhagen, the main rivals of his previous club Brøndby. On 17 June 2021, Copenhagen confirmed that he had left the club.

On 12 September 2021, Andersen joined Danish amateur club VB 1968.

International career

Andersen was called up for the Denmark under-21 national team in June 2001, where he immediately displaced the two-years older Rune Pedersen. While at AB, he reached 21 games for the Danish under-21 national team, and was the first goalkeeper to win a Danish talent award, when he was named 2003 Danish under-21 Talent of the Year.

Following strong displays for AB, Andersen made his Danish national team debut against Spain in a March 2004 friendly match. It would be four-and-a-half years before he got his second cap. He was selected as a backup goalkeeper for the Denmark national team for the 2004 European Championship, where Thomas Sørensen was preferred as the starting goalkeeper in every game. While playing for Brøndby, Andersen got his second cap in September 2008, and replaced the injured Thomas Sørensen for three games in the 2010 FIFA World Cup qualification. He was included in the Denmark national team for the 2010 FIFA World Cuptournament. After the injured Thomas Sørensen was ruled out of UEFA Euro 2012, Andersen replaced him as the first-choice goalkeeper for the Danish national team.

Honours
Brøndby IF
 Danish Cup: 2007–08
 Royal League: 2006-07

Copenhagen
 Danish Superliga: 2015–16, 2016–17, 2018–19
 Danish Cup: 2014–15, 2015–16, 2016–17

Individual
 Danish under-21 Talent of the Year: 2003
 Danish Goalkeeper of the Year: 2008
 Danish Cup Fighter: 2017

References

External links

 
 
 
 
 
 Stephan Andersen at Voetbal International 

1981 births
Living people
Association football goalkeepers
Danish men's footballers
Denmark international footballers
Denmark youth international footballers
Denmark under-21 international footballers
UEFA Euro 2004 players
2010 FIFA World Cup players
UEFA Euro 2012 players
Hvidovre IF players
Charlton Athletic F.C. players
Brøndby IF players
Thonon Evian Grand Genève F.C. players
Real Betis players
Go Ahead Eagles players
F.C. Copenhagen players
Danish Superliga players
Premier League players
Ligue 1 players
La Liga players
Eredivisie players
Danish expatriate men's footballers
Danish expatriate sportspeople in England
Danish expatriate sportspeople in France
Danish expatriate sportspeople in Spain
Expatriate footballers in England
Expatriate footballers in France
Expatriate footballers in Spain
Footballers from Copenhagen